Tolon may refer to:


Places
Tolon, the Occitan name of Toulon, a city in southern France
Tolon, Ghana, a town in the Northern Region, Ghana
Tolon District, Ghana
Tolon-Kumbungu District, Ghana
Tolon, Katharevousa name of Tolo, a village in the Peloponnese, Greece
Tolon, Russia, several rural localities in Russia

People
Canan Tolon (born 1955), Turkish-born artist
Hurşit Tolon (born 1942), Turkish general
Kamil Tolon (born 1912), Turkish businessperson, industrialist, and inventor
Kenneth Tolon II (born 1981), American college football player
Mahmut Tolon (born 1950), Turkish farmer, physician, and demographer
Miguel Teurbe Tolón (1820–1857), Cuban playwright, poet, and the creator of Cuba's flag and coat of arms
Tolon Brown, writer/producer of the children's TV series Arthur

Other
Tolon (crater), a crater on Mars
Tolon (Ghana parliament constituency), a constituency represented in the Parliament of Ghana

See also
 
 Tolono, Illinois
 Tulun, Iran